Alfredo Seiferheld (July 26, 1950 – June 3, 1988) was a Paraguayan writer, historian, and journalist.

Early life and education
Seiferheld was born in Villarrica, Guairá into a Jewish family of German and Russian background. His parents fled Europe and settled years before in Paraguay. He received his high school diploma in 1967. At the beginning of the seventies, Seiferheld studied at the University of the Sorbonne in Paris. Subsequently, he pursued postgraduate studies at the School of Philosophy of the National University of Asunción where he received a gold medal. He was married to Bibi Yurita.

Career
In 1986 he received his doctorate degree for his thesis work titled Nazism and fascism in Paraguay.  Seiferheld published Post and stamps Paraguayans in 1975 and Philately, fans without barriers in 1976. He was the founder and first president of the Philatelic Association of Paraguay. He authored a book The Jews in Paraguay in 1981, reflecting on the Jewish presence in Paraguay. He was an active journalist in the daily newspaper ABC Color in Paraguay, where he published numerous articles of historical content, some of them gathered in the 'Politico-Military Talks'''. He was a correspondent for the Associated Press news agency and the U.S. Times magazine. He was the creator of the Editorial Historical. Seiferheld's works during his last years were the most prolific in the field of culture. He died after a long illness on June 3, 1988, aged 37 years.

Works
 Correos y sellos Paraguayos (1975)
 Filatelia, afición sin barreras (1976)
 Economía y petróleo durante la Guerra del Chaco (1983)
 Nazismo y fascismo en el Paraguay (1986)
 Conversaciones Político-Militares (1988)

Awards
 He was elected by the Junior Chamber of Paraguay in 1980. In 1982 he was named among the "12-year", an important award granted by radio from Paraguay.

Testimonies
 The architect and scholar of Paraguayan history Jorge Rubbiani stated: "Alfredo offered all Paraguayans a mirror that since we returned, with disturbing fidelity, the Paraguayan reality of this, and also made it possible to know the facts in their true dimension, demystify, argue about any conflicts that acquired notoriety simply because they never knew the extent of their insignificance. The reports, studies and analyses made by Alfredo extinguish many "official versions" enshrined by interests that had nothing to do with the history and let us return the voice of "silenced" by those excluded from key players in camouflaged anonymity imposed by bureaucratic controls.
 Maestro Paraguayan Luis Szarán stated: "Alfredo taught us by example to understand irony and the deepest questions of life., in a practical way and rationals"

Organizations
 As indicated, he was the founder and first president of the 'Philatelic association of Paraguay'''.
 Member of the Institute of International Relations Studies and geopolitics.
 Member of the Inter-American philatelic writers.
 Member of the Academy of Paraguayan history.
 Postal History Society of New York.

References

Sources
 Alfredo Seiferheld: A man of commitment and responsibility ". Jorge Rubbiani. Weekly Mail. Ultima Hora, June 7, 2008

1950 births
1988 deaths
People from Villarrica, Paraguay
Paraguayan Jews
Paraguayan journalists
Paraguayan historians
Male journalists
Paraguayan people of German-Jewish descent
Paraguayan people of Russian-Jewish descent
Jewish writers
20th-century historians
20th-century journalists